Fahrudin Durak (Turkish: Fahrettin Durak; born 18 July 1966) is an Yugoslav former professional footballer who played as a midfielder.

Club career
Born in Mitrovica, he started playing in KF Prishtina (1984–86) before moved to Yugoslav First League clubs Fc Prishtina (1987–89) and Belgrade's FK Rad (1989–92). In 1992, he moved to Turkey where he played in Galatasaray S.K. (1992–93) and Bursaspor (1995–97), while the rest of his career he spend playing in German clubs SpVgg Unterhaching (1994–95), Tennis Borussia Berlin (1996) and VfR Mannheim (2000). He also played for Fc Prishtina again in the late 1990s.

International career
Durak made one appearance for the Yugoslav U21 national team.

References

External sources
 playerhistory.com
 Stats at Statistik-Klein.
 Profile at Turksports.

1966 births
Living people
Sportspeople from Mitrovica, Kosovo
Kosovan Turks
Yugoslav people of Turkish descent
Kosovan people of Turkish descent
Association football midfielders
Yugoslav footballers
Kosovan footballers
Turkish footballers
FK Trepča players
FC Prishtina players
FK Rad players
Galatasaray S.K. footballers
SpVgg Unterhaching players
Bursaspor footballers
Tennis Borussia Berlin players
VfR Mannheim players
Kosovan expatriate footballers
Kosovan expatriate sportspeople in Germany
Expatriate footballers in Germany
Kosovan expatriate sportspeople in Turkey
Expatriate footballers in Turkey